Riyaz Uddin is an Indian miniature painter from Jaipur Jaipur is in India. He has collaborated with British artist Alexander Gorlizki to produce cross-cultural artworks.

References

Indian male painters
Living people
Indian Muslims
Year of birth missing (living people)
Artists from Jaipur
Painters from Rajasthan